Stadio della Roma was the temporary name for Serie A team A.S. Roma's planned stadium in the Tor di Valle neighborhood of Rome. But as of February 2021, the project was halted after being planned to open in the 2020–21 season. The planned location was along the Roma Tiburtina station and accessible via the main highway A24-A25 connecting the city with Leonardo da Vinci–Fiumicino Airport, by Suburban railways 
and the line B' s Quintiliani station. Seating capacity was planned for 52,500 spectators. The stadium was designed by American architect Dan Meis in collaboration with the multidisciplinary engineering firm SCE Project and Arup (MEP engineering) and it was said to be inspired by the ancient Colosseum. Features of the stadium included luxury boxes, and a 14,000-seat section designated for the Ultras of the Curva Sud in the Stadio Olimpico, the 72,698-seat facility Roma currently shares with their city rival, S.S. Lazio.

Background
The stadium and its facilities were to replace the current Tor di Valle Racecourse, which is served by the Tor di Valle train stop on the Rome–Lido railway. Plans additionally called for service on Rome's Line B subway to be extended to the station, and on to Muratella, a train station on the FR1 railway that is across the river from the proposed development. Besides the main stadium, plans called for additional venues for music, entertainment, shopping, and training facilities, as well as bars, restaurants, and a Nike SuperStore. The stadium, the fifth in Italy to be privately owned and financed, was estimated to cost €300 million, but the total cost for all the facilities and venues, including infrastructure improvement, would have been close to €1 billion in 2014 figures.

Development
In 2016 Goldman Sachs made a €30 million loan to Stadio TDV S.p.A., a wholly owned subsidiary of NEEP Roma Holding, for the pre-development cost of the stadium.

On 2 February 2017, the Region of Lazio and the mayor of Rome rejected the proposal to build a new stadium, however, the proposal was later approved on 24 February after final review of the stadium's design adjustments. In August 2017, the stadium hit another delay, with a new planning process beginning in September. Roma subsequently renewed their lease with the Stadio Olimpico until 2020. In December 2017, the stadium plans were approved, with the stadium expected to be ready to open for the 2020–21 season. On 26 February 2021, it was announced that the stadium project was halted.

References

External links 
 
Stadio Della Roma - Data Scheet

Football venues in Italy
Proposed stadiums
A.S. Roma
Sports venues in Rome
Proposed buildings and structures in Italy